Clohars-Fouesnant is a commune in the Finistère department of Brittany in north-western France.

Population
Inhabitants of Clohars-Fouesnant are called in French 
Cloharsiens.

See also
Communes of the Finistère department

References

External links

Mayors of Finistère Association  

Communes of Finistère